Jangguk-juk is a juk, or Korean  porridge, made by boiling rice in malgeun-jangguk, a soup soy sauce-based beef broth made with seasoned ground beef stir-fried in sesame oil. The porridge is referred to as uyuk-juk ("beef porridge") in Jeungbo sallim gyeongje, a 1766 book.

Preparation 
To make jangguk, ground beef is seasoned with chopped scallions, minced garlic, soup soy sauce, sesame oil, and ground black pepper, then stir-fried in sesame oil. Water is added to the stir-fried beef and any foam or excess oil is skimmed. When the broth is fully flavored, soaked rice is added and boiled until the porridge reaches the desired consistency.

Lean meat such as beef round is preferred, and the porridge should be mildly seasoned. It is good for recovering patients and the elderly.

See also 
 Congee
 Jeonbok-juk
 Korean royal court cuisine
 List of porridges

References 

Beef dishes
Juk
Korean royal court cuisine